Ryan Choi (born December 2, 1984 in Honolulu, Hawai'i) is a composer and multi-instrumentalist.

Biography
Choi was classically trained on the double bass from an early age and took up the ukulele in high school.  Self-taught as a composer, he first came to international recognition for a series of releases for the baritone ukulele that were among the first to showcase the instrument's avant-garde potential.  His debut album, Three Dancers, created after a years-long absence from music, won the 2016 Independent Music Award for Best Instrumental EP  and featured the composer on prepared baritone ukulele, percussion and electronics. His work, favoring improvisation and experimentation, is often dense, intricate, and mathematically complex, utilizing advanced harmony and drawing on a range of visual, literary, and musical sources.  He also makes extensive use of preparations and alternative tunings. He has collaborated with Kommissar Hjuler and Mama Baer. He lives and works in Honolulu, Hawai'i.

Discography

Solo
 "Three Dancers" (2016)
 "Whenmill" (2016)

Collaborations
 "Company / Arbors" (2016) with Kommissar Hjuler and Mama Baer
 "IT-FIGURES" (2017) with Kommissar Hjuler and Mama Baer

Compilations
 "30" (2015)
 "I Never Meta Guitar Four" (2017), compiled by Elliott Sharp, on Clean Feed Records
 "Various - FLUXUS" (2017), Psych.KG

References 

American jazz musicians
Hawaiian ukulele players
21st-century American composers
Living people
1984 births
American classical composers